The Rotvoll controversy refers to a political controversy in Norway in 1991 concerning the construction of a research and development (R&D) facility for Statoil at Rotvoll outside Trondheim.

Key events
The background for the controversy was that Statoil wanted to establish a new research and development centre in Trondheim, and had acquired land at the recreational area Rotvoll to the east of Trondheim. This area was an agriculture boundary right outside Trondheim, and was connected to Leangenbukta (English: Leangen Bay), an important bird life area. There were some old farms at Rotvoll as well, considered to be worth protecting.

There was a lot of secrecy around the formal approval of the construction at Rotvoll, and the approval process did not, like the law required, undertake a study of the consequences for the environment. Both the Norwegian Directorate for Nature Management, the County Governor and city antiquarian opposed the construction. Nonetheless, the city council gave Statoil permission to proceed.

The controversy became national on 30 June when the Norwegian Broadcasting Corporation made a large story on the national news, followed up by a number of national newspapers. The main content of the news was the tent camp that had been established at Rotvoll, to prohibit the construction. The tent camp consisted among others of members of Natur og Ungdom and the Norwegian Society for the Conservation of Nature. In the first week of the tent camp there was sunshine, but since then it was continuously rainy. Each weekend there was a family day at Rotvoll, including appearances of singer Hans Rotmo. Statoil refused to accept any of the alternative locations provided by the environmentalists, despite meetings between the CEO Harald Norvik and environmentalists. Statoil also had multiple full-page advertisements in the Trondheim newspapers Arbeider-Avisa and Adresseavisen. 

After school start in August there were few activists left at the camp, and in early October Statoil sent a letter to them informing them that they would start construction soon. On 10 October 1991 the police woke the activists and informed them that Statoil was to start construction. This resulted in a quick mobilisation and 75 activists refusing to move in civil disobedience. They were removed by the police, and that day the construction workers did as much damage as possible to hinder more actions, but the next day 65 people let themselves be arrested to hinder construction. The following day a legal demonstration was held by 500 people outside the construction area.

Legacy
The controversy was quite prominent in Trondheim, and though Statoil Rotvoll was built, it resulted in other environmental victories later
 A few years later a green area at Fagerheim in Trondheim was not demolished, partially to avoid a new Rotvoll incident.
 Area planning in Trondheim has since shifted, and instead of building large work places outside the town, they are being moved into town. Examples of this include Fokus Bank, the city administration, the county administration and Adresseavisen (announced) in addition to the planned centralising of the Norwegian University of Science and Technology and Sør-Trøndelag University College, totaling many thousands of jobs.
 Environmental groups threatened with new demonstrations and actions when Statoil announced plans for expansions of Statoil Rotvoll in 2004.

References

Environmental protests in Norway
20th century in Trondheim
Nature and Youth
Equinor
1991 in Norway
Political controversies in Norway
1991 in the environment